Stigmella circumargentea is a moth of the family Nepticulidae. It is only known from Yunnan.

The wingspan is about 6.2 mm. Larvae have been found in October; adults were reared in November.

The larvae feed on Lithocarpus dealbatus and possibly Lithocarpus mairei. They mine the leaves of their host plant. The mine consists of a long gallery, varying from sinuous to almost straight, with linear to dispersed frass filling the early mine, later the frass occupies about one third of the width of the mine.

External links
Nepticulidae (Lepidoptera) in China, 1. Introduction and Stigmella (Schrank) feeding on Fagaceae

Nepticulidae
Moths of Asia
Moths described in 2000